University High School (UHS) is a charter high school on the campus of California State University, Fresno, in Fresno, California. The school emphasizes college-prep academics and music. UHS opened in 2000 with Dr. Brad Huff as the founding Head of School, with its first class graduating in 2004. At the end of the 2004–2005 school year, approximately 370 students were enrolled. The school now has a steady enrollment of about 480 students. University High School is chartered by Fresno Unified School District and has special autonomy over its administration.

Extracurricular activities
Academic teams include Academic Decathlon, Science Olympiad, Mock Trial, and Speech and Debate. The school is the ten-time champions in the Small School United States Academic Decathlon Online National Competition

References

External links
 

High schools in Fresno, California
Charter high schools in California
Educational institutions established in 2000
2000 establishments in California